Kramsach is a municipality in the Kufstein district in the Austrian state of Tyrol located 27 km southwest of Kufstein and 16.5 km west of Wörgl, at the northern side of the Inn River. Its main sources of income are the marble, timber and glass industries, as well as summer tourism. Kramsach is also known as the "Lake village of Tyrol" because there are six lakes nearby.

References

External links
Website of Kramsach

Cities and towns in Kufstein District